Muhammet Özdin (born September 10, 1978 in Vakfıkebir, Turkey) is a Turkish footballer who last played for Arsinspor. He is a central defender who can also play as right back. Raised in the ranks of Trabzonspor youth teams he travelled several Anatolian clubs.

References

1978 births
Living people
Turkish footballers
Trabzonspor footballers
Erzurumspor footballers
Kocaelispor footballers
Akçaabat Sebatspor footballers
Sakaryaspor footballers
Siirtspor footballers
Kardemir Karabükspor footballers
People from Vakfıkebir
Association football midfielders